Thomas Stephen Edward Maibaum Fellow of the Royal Society of Arts (FRSA) is a computer scientist.

Maibaum has a Bachelor of Science (B.Sc.) undergraduate degree in pure mathematics from the University of Toronto, Canada (1970), and a Doctor of Philosophy (Ph.D.) in computer science from Queen Mary and Royal Holloway Colleges, University of London, England (1974).

Maibaum has held academic posts at Imperial College, London, King's College London (UK) and McMaster University (Canada). His research interests have concentrated on the theory of specification, together with its application in different contexts, in the general area of software engineering.

From 1996 to 2005, he was involved with developing international standards in programming and informatics, as a member of the International Federation for Information Processing (IFIP) IFIP Working Group 2.1 on Algorithmic Languages and Calculi, which specified, maintains, and supports the programming languages ALGOL 60 and ALGOL 68.

He is a Fellow of the Institution of Engineering and Technology and the Royal Society of Arts.

References

External links
 KCL home page
 , McMaster University
 
 
 
 

Living people
20th-century Hungarian people
Hungarian expatriates in Canada
University of Toronto alumni
Hungarian expatriates in the United Kingdom
Alumni of Queen Mary University of London
Alumni of Royal Holloway, University of London
Academics of Imperial College London
Academics of King's College London
Hungarian computer scientists
Formal methods people
Academic staff of McMaster University
Fellows of the Institution of Engineering and Technology
Year of birth missing (living people)